The 2016 NBA Finals was the championship series of the National Basketball Association's (NBA) 2015–16 season and conclusion of the 2016 playoffs. The Eastern Conference champion Cleveland Cavaliers defeated the defending NBA champion and Western Conference champion Golden State Warriors four games to three in a rematch of the previous year's Finals. It was the 14th rematch of the previous NBA Finals in history, and the second straight rematch in back-to-back years, as the Miami Heat and San Antonio Spurs played each other in 2013 and 2014. The series was played from June 2 to 19.

The Golden State Warriors gained home-court advantage based on their record-breaking league-best record (73–9). At one point, the Warriors led 3–1 but the Cavaliers won the next three games to win their first championship in franchise history and end the Cleveland sports curse. They are also the first team in Finals history to overcome a 3–1 deficit and the fourth team in NBA history to win the series after losing the first two games. This also marked the first time since 1978 that Game 7 was won by the road team.

LeBron James was named the Finals MVP (MVP), receiving all 11 Finals MVP votes, and was also the first player in NBA history to lead all players in a playoff series in points, rebounds, assists, steals and blocks.

Background

Cleveland Cavaliers

This was Cleveland's second consecutive trip to the NBA Finals, and third overall, seeking to win their first ever NBA championship. This would also be the sixth consecutive NBA Finals appearance for LeBron James, the most for any player not part of the 1960s Boston Celtics, and the fifth for James Jones (who technically qualified for the 2011 NBA Finals along with James, but did not play).

Despite holding the best record in the Eastern Conference at 30–11 midway through the season on January 22, 2016, the Cavaliers fired head coach David Blatt. Associate head coach Tyronn Lue was then promoted to replace Blatt. General Manager David Griffin cited "a lack of fit with our personnel and our vision" as the reason for Blatt's firing.

Cleveland finished the regular season with a 57–25 record, capturing the Central Division title and the top playoff seed in the Eastern Conference. They then advanced to the Finals after sweeping both the Detroit Pistons in the first round and the Atlanta Hawks in the second round, and defeating the Toronto Raptors in the Eastern Conference Finals in six games. The Cavaliers were the first team in history to go to two consecutive
NBA Finals with rookie head coaches.

Golden State Warriors

This was the defending NBA Champion Golden State Warriors' second consecutive trip to the NBA Finals and eighth overall. The Warriors broke the record set by the 1995–96 Chicago Bulls by finishing the regular season with a 73–9 record. In addition, the Warriors broke numerous other NBA records, including most road wins (34), best start to a season (24–0) and longest regular-season home win streak (54 dating back to the 2014–15 season). They also became the first team to make over 1,000 three-pointers in the regular-season with 1,077, eclipsing the previous record of 933 set by the 2014–15 Houston Rockets.

The Warriors were led by Stephen Curry, who was named the NBA Most Valuable Player (MVP) for the second straight season. The Splash Brothers twosome of Curry and Klay Thompson were the highest scoring duo in the league, combining to average 52.2 points per game. Head coach Steve Kerr missed the first 43 regular season games because of a back injury. Assistant coach Luke Walton served as interim head coach during Kerr's absence and he led the Warriors to a 39–4 start.

In the playoffs, the Warriors defeated the Houston Rockets in the first round and the Portland Trail Blazers in the conference semifinals in five games each. Curry missed six games in the first two rounds due to injuries. He missed two games after tweaking his right ankle in Game 1 against the Rockets. In his first game back in Game 4, he sprained his right knee and was sidelined for two weeks, missing four games. In Game 7 of the Western Conference Finals, the Warriors defeated the Oklahoma City Thunder, 96–88, becoming only the 10th team in NBA history to overcome a 3–1 series deficit, and advancing to a second straight NBA Finals for the first time since 1947 and 1948.

Road to the Finals

Regular season series
The Warriors won the regular season series 2–0.

Series summary

Game summaries
''All times are in Eastern Daylight Time (UTC−4)

Game 1

The Warriors defeated the Cavaliers 104–89 in Game 1 to take a 1–0 series lead. The Cavaliers led 68–67 before the Warriors broke the game open with a 29–9 run spanning the third and fourth quarters to take a 96–76 lead. Cleveland cut the deficit to within eleven points at 98–87 after an 11–2 run, but Stephen Curry and Klay Thompson nailed back-to-back three-pointers to essentially seal the victory for Golden State. While Curry and Thompson had a rough night combining for 20 points, the Warriors got a lift from its bench, outscoring the Cavaliers' bench 45–10. Shaun Livingston scored his playoff-career high 20 points to lead Golden State, while Kyrie Irving led all scorers with 26 points. LeBron James fell one assist shy of a triple-double (23 points, 12 rebounds, 9 assists).

Game 2

The Warriors defeated the Cavaliers 110–77 in Game 2 to take a 2–0 series lead. Cleveland took a 28–22 lead about two minutes into the second quarter, but Golden State answered with a 20–2 run while outscoring the Cavs 30–16 the rest of the period. During the run, the Cavaliers' Kevin Love suffered a head injury while attempting to grab a defensive rebound. Love stayed throughout the remainder of the period but did not play the second half. The Warriors continued to dominate Cleveland from there, outscoring the Cavaliers 58–33 in the final two quarters. Draymond Green led all scorers with 28 points, including 5 of 8 from three-point range. Curry and Klay Thompson added 18 and 17 points, respectively, while drilling four threes each.

With their victory, the Warriors posted the highest winning margin in the first two Finals games with a 48-point differential. James led the Cavs with 19 points, 8 rebounds, 9 assists and 4 steals, surpassing John Stockton for fourth on the all-time playoff steals list. However, he also committed 7 turnovers in the loss.

Game 3

The Cavaliers avenged their lopsided defeat to Golden State by routing the Warriors 120–90 in Game 3 to cut the series deficit to 2–1. The Cavaliers scored the game's first nine points en route to outscoring the Warriors 33–16 after one quarter. Golden State rallied to trim Cleveland's lead as low as seven points on a couple of occasions before the Cavs settled for a 51–43 halftime lead. In the second half, Cleveland continued to extend their lead and outscored Golden State 69–47. Love did not play due to a concussion. James led all scorers with 32 points. Irving added 30 points for the Cavs. Curry led the Warriors with 19 points, while drilling four threes. Harrison Barnes also contributed 18 points in 33 minutes of play.

Game 4

The Warriors defeated the Cavaliers 108–97 in Game 4 to take a 3–1 series lead. After averaging just 16 points in the first three games of the series, Curry scored 38 and was 7 of 13 on three-pointers. The Warriors made 17 three-pointers, then an NBA record for a single Finals game. They made only 16 two-point field goals, the first time in Finals history a team made more shots from three-point range. Klay Thompson added 25 points and four three-pointers for Golden State. It was the Warriors' 88th win of the season, which broke the 1995–96 Chicago Bulls record of 87 for most wins in an NBA season (regular-season and postseason combined).	

Green and James had to be separated in the closing minutes of the game, when Green fell to the ground and James stepped over him.	
Feeling disrespected, Green swung his arm and appeared to make contact with James' groin.

Game 5

The Cavaliers defeated the Warriors 112–97 in Game 5 to narrow the Warriors' series lead to 3–2. James and Irving each scored 41 points to become the first teammates in Finals history to score 40 or more in the same game. James also added 16 rebounds, 7 assists, 3 steals and 3 blocks, whilst Irving had 6 assists of his own. After Game 4, Green was assessed a Flagrant Foul 1 for his contact with James that was ruled "unnecessary" and "retaliatory", and James was given a technical foul for taunting. Having accumulated his fourth flagrant foul point in the playoffs, Green was suspended for Game 5, becoming the first player to be suspended from playing in a Finals game since Jerry Stackhouse in 2006. Green watched the game from a luxury box in the nearby Oakland Alameda Coliseum, where the Oakland Athletics were also playing a game at the same time, hosting the Texas Rangers.

Warriors center Andrew Bogut suffered a season-ending injury to his left knee in the second half when he jumped to block a layup attempt by Cavs guard J. R. Smith and came down awkwardly on Smith.

Game 6

The Cavaliers defeated the Warriors 115–101 in Game 6 to even the series 3–3. The Cavaliers scored the game's first eight points en route to outscoring the Warriors 31–11 after one quarter. Golden State rallied to trim Cleveland's lead as low as eight points on a couple of occasions before the Cavs settled for a 59–43 halftime lead, with Tristan Thompson having his best performance of the series, registering a double-double in the first half alone. In the second half, Cleveland continued to extend their lead and tied the series. LeBron James led the Cavs with a historic performance of 41 points, 11 assists, 8 rebounds, 4 steals and 3 blocks whilst only committing 1 turnover. Kyrie Irving added 23 points, while Tristan Thompson had 16 rebounds for the Cavaliers. Stephen Curry led the Warriors with 30 points, drilling six threes, and Klay Thompson added 25 points. Back from suspension, Green was held to just eight points on 3–7 shooting.

James scored 18 straight points for Cleveland from the end of the third quarter to the 7:00 mark of the fourth. Late in the game with the Cavaliers up by 13, he blocked a Curry shot from behind, and afterward had some words for him. With 4:22 left, Curry received his sixth foul and fouled out of the game. He then threw his mouthpiece into the stands in frustration, resulting in a technical foul and his ejection from the game. Curry was the first MVP to foul out of an NBA Finals game since Shaquille O'Neal in 2000. The Cavaliers became the third team to fall behind 3–1 and force Game 7 (and the first in 50 years). James was the first player to have consecutive 40-point games in the Finals since, coincidentally, Shaquille O'Neal in the 2000 Finals. Following the game, Curry and Warriors head coach Steve Kerr were fined $25,000 each for their actions and public officiating criticism.

Game 7

This season's Finals marked the first time in NBA history in which both teams entered Game 7 with the same total points scored through six games (610 points each). The Cavaliers defeated the Warriors 93–89 in Game 7 to win the series 4–3. Game 7 was close, with 20 lead changes and 11 ties. This was the only game in the series to have a final margin of fewer than 10 points. At halftime, the Warriors were ahead 49–42. In the second half, the Cavaliers outscored the Warriors 51–40 as the Warriors failed to score a basket during the last 4:39 of the game. In the closing minutes of the 4th quarter, LeBron James delivered what became known as "The Block" on a layup attempt by Andre Iguodala with the score tied at 89 and 1:50 remaining in the game. Kyrie Irving made a go-ahead 3-point field goal over Stephen Curry to give Cleveland a 92–89 lead with 0:53 remaining in the game. Before Kyrie Irving's 3-point field goal, both teams were tied at 699 points scored apiece in this series. Immediately after Irving's 3-pointer, Golden State brought the ball up-court, opting not to call a timeout, and although Golden State got a preferred switch and matchup of Curry on Kevin Love, Love made arguably "the biggest defensive stop of the entire NBA season", and forced Curry into a contested 3-pointer, which he missed. After LeBron James hurt his right wrist on a dunk attempt in which he was fouled by Draymond Green, he virtually clinched the title for the Cavaliers by making one of two free throws, putting them 4 points ahead with only 10.6 seconds left in the game. The Cavaliers fouled Draymond Green with 6.5 seconds remaining. Stephen Curry received the ensuing inbounds pass, pump faked and shot a three-pointer over Cavaliers guard Iman Shumpert. The attempt missed, and was rebounded by Marreese Speights of the Warriors who then missed a three-point attempt as time expired. Draymond Green put up his best performance of the Finals, leading all scorers with 32 points, including 6 of 8 from three-point range to go along with 15 rebounds and 9 assists. Stephen Curry and Klay Thompson added 17 and 14 points, respectively. LeBron James led all Cavaliers with 27 points and became only the third player ever in NBA history to record a triple double in an NBA Finals Game 7 by adding 11 assists and 11 rebounds. Kyrie Irving added 26 points for Cleveland.

The Cavaliers became the first team in NBA history to come back from a 3–1 series deficit to win the NBA Finals. They became the first NBA Champion to clinch all their playoff series on the road since the 1999 San Antonio Spurs, as well as the first road team to win a Finals Game 7 since the 1978 Washington Bullets. The Cavaliers won their first championship in franchise history, ending a 52-year pro sports championship drought for the city of Cleveland (whose previous victory was when the 1964 Cleveland Browns defeated the Baltimore Colts in the NFL Championship game), as well as 26-year drought for the State of Ohio (whose previous championship was when the 1990 Cincinnati Reds defeated the Oakland Athletics in the World Series). LeBron James was named the unanimous Finals MVP, becoming only the fifth player in NBA history to earn the award three times or more. He also was the overall leader in points, rebounds, assists, steals, and blocks during the series, a feat that had never been accomplished in an NBA playoff series. Tyronn Lue became the 14th coach to win an NBA championship as a head coach and player.

This also marked the first time an NBA Finals went to a Game 7 under the 2-2-1-1-1 format since it was reinstated in 2014.

On July 13, Game 7 of the 2016 NBA Finals received the 2016 ESPY award for Best Game.

Rosters

Cleveland Cavaliers

Golden State Warriors

Player statistics

Cleveland Cavaliers

|-
| style="text-align:left;"|  || 6 || 0 || 7.6 || .263 || .167 || .833 || 0.5 || 1.0 || 0.0 || 0.0 || 2.7
|-
| style="text-align:left;"|  || 4 || 0 || 8.3 || .000 || .000 || 1.000 || 0.8 || 0.0 || 0.0 || 0.5 || 0.5
|-
| style="text-align:left;"|  || 7 || 7 || 39.0 || .468 || .405 || .939 || 3.9 || 3.9 || 2.1 || 0.7 || 27.1
|-! style="background:#FDE910;"
| style="text-align:left;"|  || 7 || 7 || 41.7 || .494 || .371 || .721 || 11.3 || 8.9 || 2.6 || 2.3 || 29.7
|-
| style="text-align:left;"|  || 7 || 2 || 24.0 || .516 || .167 || .636 || 5.3 || 0.4 || 1.3 || 0.1 || 5.7
|-
| style="text-align:left;"|  || 6 || 0 || 3.0 || .500 || .000 || .800 || 0.3 || 0.0 || 0.0 || 0.2 || 1.3
|-
| style="text-align:left;"|  || 5 || 0 || 4.0 || .000 || .000 || .250 || 0.4 || 0.4 || 0.0 || 0.0 || 0.2
|-
| style="text-align:left;"|  || 6 || 5 || 26.3 || .362 || .263 || .706 || 6.8 || 1.3 || 0.7 || 0.3 || 8.5
|-
| style="text-align:left;"|  || 1 || 0 || 3.0 || 1.000 || .000 || .000 || 1.0 || 0.0 || 0.0 || 0.0 || 4.0
|-
| style="text-align:left;"|  || 5 || 0 || 5.0 || .333 || .000 || .750 || 1.6 || 0.0 || 0.6 || 0.2 || 1.4
|-
| style="text-align:left;"|  || 7 || 0 || 18.3 || .304 || .267 || 1.000 || 1.6 || 0.1 || 0.1 || 0.3 || 3.0
|-
| style="text-align:left;"|  || 7 || 7 || 37.3 || .400 || .356 || .667 || 2.7 || 1.6 || 1.4 || 0.3 || 10.6
|-
| style="text-align:left;"|  || 7 || 7 || 32.3 || .636 || .000 || .533 || 10.1 || 0.7 || 0.3 || 0.9 || 10.3
|-
| style="text-align:left;"|  || 6 || 0 || 4.8 || .333 || .200 || .000 || 0.5 || 0.2 || 0.5 || 0.0 || 1.5

Golden State Warriors

|-
| style="text-align:left;"|  || 6 || 0 || 13.1 || .643 || .500 || .727 || 1.0 || 0.8 || 0.5 || 0.2 || 8.2
|-
| style="text-align:left;"|  || 7 || 7 || 31.7 || .352 || .310 || .600 || 4.4 || 1.4 || 0.7 || 0.4 || 9.3
|-
| style="text-align:left;"|  || 5 || 5 || 12.0 || .471 || .000 || .000 || 3.0 || 0.6 || 0.4 || 2.0 || 3.2
|-
| style="text-align:left;"|  || 4 || 0 || 4.8 || .625 || .600 || .000 || 0.8 || 0.5 || 0.0 || 0.0 || 3.3
|-
| style="text-align:left;"|  || 7 || 7 || 35.1 || .403 || .400 || .929 || 4.9 || 3.7 || 0.9 || 0.7 || 22.6
|-
| style="text-align:left;"|  || 7 || 1 || 8.6 || .300 || .000 || .500 || 1.9 || 0.4 || 0.1 || 0.1 || 2.0
|-
| style="text-align:left;"|  || 6 || 6 || 40.0 || .486 || .406 || .783 || 10.3 || 6.3 || 1.7 || 1.0 || 16.5
|-
| style="text-align:left;"|  || 7 || 2 || 34.1 || .466 || .304 || .333 || 6.3 || 4.1 || 0.9 || 0.7 || 9.1
|-
| style="text-align:left;"|  || 7 || 0 || 21.1 || .511 || .000 || .857 || 3.4 || 2.9 || 0.3 || 0.3 || 8.3
|-
| style="text-align:left;"|  || 3 || 0 || 6.1 || 1.000 || .000 || .000 || 1.3 || 0.3 || 0.0 || 0.0 || 1.3
|-
| style="text-align:left;"|  || 1 || 0 || 5.5 || .000 || .000 || .500 || 1.0 || 0.0 || 0.4 || 0.2 || 0.2
|-
| style="text-align:left;"|  || 7 || 0 || 4.7 || .222 || .400 || 1.000 || 1.3 || 0.3 || 0.1 || 0.3 || 2.0
|-
| style="text-align:left;"|  || 7 || 7 || 35.3 || .427 || .350 || .786 || 3.0 || 1.9 || 1.0 || 0.6 || 19.6
|-
| style="text-align:left;"|  || 6 || 0 || 6.9 || .000 || .000 || .500 || 1.3 || 1.0 || 0.2 || 0.0 || 1.2

Broadcast
In the United States, the NBA Finals aired on ABC with Mike Breen as play-by-play commentator, and Jeff Van Gundy and Mark Jackson serving as color commentators. TNT's Craig Sager made an appearance for Game 6 as a sideline reporter, his first appearance at the NBA Finals, and his last game before he died later that year in December. ESPN Radio aired it as well and had Kevin Calabro and Hubie Brown as commentators. ESPN Deportes provided exclusive Spanish-language coverage of The Finals, with a commentary team of Álvaro Martín and Carlos Morales.

Aftermath
The Cavaliers and Warriors also met in the following two NBA Finals, the first time in any of North America's four major professional sports leagues that the same two teams met for the championship four years in a row. Durant was named the Finals' MVP in both series.

Three years later, they made it to their sixth Finals in eight seasons and defeated the Boston Celtics in six games.

James left the Cavaliers in the 2018 offseason to join the Los Angeles Lakers. The Cavaliers did not return to the playoffs until the 2021-22 NBA season, when they qualified for the play-in tournament.

See also 

 Death Lineup
 Cavaliers–Warriors rivalry

References

External links
Official website
2016 NBA Finals at Basketball-Reference.com

Finals
National Basketball Association Finals
NBA
NBA
2016 in sports in California
2016 in sports in Ohio
2010s in Oakland, California
2010s in Cleveland
NBA Finals
Basketball competitions in Oakland, California
Basketball competitions in Cleveland
ABS-CBN television specials